Durham City or City of Durham may refer to:

England
Durham, England, the county town of County Durham
Durham District, a former local government district, which held city status 1974-2009
Durham and Framwelgate, a former local government district, which held city status until 1974
City of Durham (parish), a civil parish
City of Durham (UK Parliament constituency)
Durham City A.F.C., a football team
Durham City RFC, a rugby union team

North America
Durham, North Carolina
Regional Municipality of Durham

See also
 Durham (disambiguation)